Pierre-Christophe Baguet (born 11 May 1955) is a French politician, mayor of Boulogne-Billancourt and member of the National Assembly of France between 1997 and 2012. He represents the Hauts-de-Seine department, and is a member of The Republicans.

References

External links
Official website

1955 births
Living people
Politicians from Paris
Social Democratic Party (France) politicians
Union for French Democracy politicians
The Republicans (France) politicians
Deputies of the 11th National Assembly of the French Fifth Republic
Deputies of the 12th National Assembly of the French Fifth Republic
Deputies of the 13th National Assembly of the French Fifth Republic
Mayors of places in Île-de-France
Knights of the Ordre national du Mérite